Vicki Lorenz Englund is an American politician who served as a Democratic member of the Missouri House of Representatives from 2009 to 2011 and from 2013 to 2015. In 2013, Englund sponsored a bill that would help the State Treasurer of Missouri return military medals to their original owners. The bill passed unanimously.

Her professional experience includes founding giftpakexpress.com, and serving as South County Sector Specialist for the St. Louis County Economic Council from 2001 to 2004.

Englund was a candidate for State Treasurer of Missouri in 2020.

Englund has filed to run for St. Louis County Council District 3 in the 2022 election.

Electoral history

State Representative

State Treasurer

References

External links
 

1974 births
21st-century American politicians
21st-century American women politicians
American University alumni
Living people
Democratic Party members of the Missouri House of Representatives
Politicians from St. Louis
Women state legislators in Missouri